Sanoj Darshika (born 22 January 1999) is a Sri Lankan cricketer. He made his first-class debut for Bloomfield Cricket and Athletic Club in Tier B of the 2018–19 Premier League Tournament on 31 January 2019. He made his Twenty20 debut for Bloomfield Cricket and Athletic Club in the 2018–19 SLC Twenty20 Tournament on 15 February 2019. He made his List A debut for Bloomfield Cricket and Athletic Club in the 2018–19 Premier Limited Overs Tournament on 4 March 2019.

References

External links
 

1999 births
Living people
Sri Lankan cricketers
Bloomfield Cricket and Athletic Club cricketers
Place of birth missing (living people)